Adam Warren is an American comic book writer and artist who is famous for being one of the first American commercial illustrators to draw using the manga style.

Bibliography

Major works

Minor works

References

Bibliographies of American writers
Bibliographies by writer